Armands is a Latvian masculine given name. People bearing the name Armands include:
Armands Ābols (born 1973), Latvian pianist
Armands Bērziņš (born 1983), Latvian ice hockey player
Armands Celitāns (born 1984), Latvian volleyball player
Armands Krauliņš (born 1939), Latvian basketball coach
Armands Ližbovskis (born 19??), Latvian track and field Paralympian athlete
Armands Šķēle (born 1983), Latvian basketball player
Armands Zeiberliņš (born 1965), Latvian footballer and manager
Armands Zvirbulis (born 1987), Latvian freestyle wrestler.

References

Latvian masculine given names